Meridian Independent School District is a public school district based in Meridian, Texas, United States.
In 2009, the school district was rated "academically acceptable" by the Texas Education Agency.

Schools
Meridian High School (Grades 6-12)
Meridian Elementary School (Grades PK-5)

References

External links
Meridian ISD

School districts in Bosque County, Texas